Donald's Diary is a Donald Duck short film which was produced in Technicolor and released February 13, 1954 by RKO Radio Pictures.

Plot

In San Francisco, Donald meets Daisy Duck and the two fall in love. They date, get engaged, and finally marry. After the honeymoon, Donald and Daisy's marriage turns sour. Daisy takes his money and burns his meals. Daisy invites her whole family for dinner leaving Donald nothing. As Daisy piles more and more chores on him, Donald gets exhausted and explodes like a bomb.

The whole thing turns out to have been a dream. Daisy gently awakens Donald, who screams in horror and runs out to join the French Foreign Legion. Donald records the whole episode in his diary.

Voice cast
 Clarence Nash as Donald Duck and Huey, Dewey and Louie 
 Vivi Janiss as Daisy Duck and Daisy's Mother
 Leslie Denison as Donald's Internal Monologue/Narrator

Home media
The short was released on November 11, 2008 on Walt Disney Treasures: The Chronological Donald, Volume Four: 1951-1961.

References

External links

1954 films
1954 short films
1954 comedy films
1954 animated films
1950s English-language films
1950s Disney animated short films
American animated short films
Donald Duck short films
Animated films about families
Films about memory
Films about weddings
Films about weddings in the United States
Films set in San Francisco
French Foreign Legion in popular culture
Films directed by Jack Kinney
Films produced by Walt Disney